The Kola Canal, or sometimes the Kolsky Canal, was a proposed canal intended to link up the basin of the Kola River in the north of Kola Peninsula with the basin of the Niva River in the south of Kola Peninsula. 

An accomplishment of this project would shorten the route of warships from the Barents Sea to the Baltic Sea.

See also 
 Kola Railway

Sources 
 Кольский канал — сказка, не ставшая былью 
 КАК СПРОЕКТИРОВАЛИ И ПОХОРОНИЛИ КОЛЬСКИЙ КАНАЛ
 Арктика за гранью фантастики. Будущее Севера глазами советских инженеров, изобретателей и писателей

Canals in Russia
Proposed canals
Transport in Murmansk Oblast
Buildings and structures in Murmansk Oblast
Proposals in the Soviet Union